Jane Bernstein (born June 10, 1949) is an American writer and novelist.

Biography
Born in Brooklyn, Bernstein received her B.A. at New York University and her M.F.A. at Columbia University. She is a professor of English at Carnegie Mellon University, where she has taught since 1991.

She lives in Pittsburgh with Jeffrey F. Cohn, Professor of Psychology at the University of Pittsburgh, and is the mother of Rachel Glynn and filmmaker Charlotte Glynn.

Other works
Her short works have been widely published in journals and magazines, among them, the New York Times Magazine, Glamour, Fourth Genre, Creative Nonfiction, and Massachusetts Review.

From 1974 to 1993, she worked as a screenwriter.  Her co-written screenplay for Seven Minutes in Heaven was released by Warner Brothers in 1986. The movie won a Special Merit Award at the U.S. Film Festival, Santa Barbara, CA in 1987 and an audience award at the Sundance Film Festival, 1986.

"Seizures", Crazyhorse, College of Charleston, Charleston, SC. Spring 2017, pps. 41-45.

 "Still Running", The Sun, February 2017. 
Reprinted in Best American Sports Writing – 2018, Jeff Pearlman, ed.

"The Marrying Kind", Creative Nonfiction. Spring 2016, pps. 27-33.

Fellowships and awards
Bernstein was twice the recipient of a National Endowment for the Arts Fellowship in Creative Writing, in 1982–1983 and in 2000–2001. She was also awarded a Pennsylvania Council on the Arts Fellowship in Media Arts in 1995 and in Creative Writing in 2002. Other fellowships and awards include two New Jersey State Council on the Arts Fellowships, and in 2004, a Fulbright Fellowship, which she spent at Bar-Ilan University in Ramat Gan, Israel. Awards for her essays include The Virginia Faulkner Award for Excellence in Writing in 2001.

Books
 Departures, Holt, Rinehart and Winston, 1979, 
 Seven Minutes in Heaven, Fawcett Juniper, 1986, 
 Loving Rachel: a family's journey from grief, Little, Brown, 1988, 
 Bereft – A Sister’s Story, North Point Press, 2000, 
 Rachel in the World,  University of Illinois Press, 2007, 
 Second Lives - Tales from Two Cities, Jane Bernstein and Rodge Glass, eds., Cargo Publishing, 2012, 
 Gina from Siberia, with Charlotte Glynn, illustrations by Anna Desnitskaya, Animal Media Group, 2018, 
 The Face Tells the Secret, Regal House, 2019,

Trivia
In the summer of 1977, while helping director Jonathan Kaplan cast the film Over the Edge, a teen rebellion film that was released in 1979, she found Matt Dillon at the Hommocks Middle School in Larchmont, New York, thus launching his acting career.

References

External links
 Jane Bernstein web site.
 Transcript of NPR Interview about her memoir Bereft.
 Houston Chronicle Review of Rachel in the World, December 6, 2007.

1949 births
20th-century American novelists
American women novelists
Carnegie Mellon University faculty
Columbia University School of the Arts alumni
Living people
New York University alumni
Writers from Brooklyn
21st-century American novelists
20th-century American women writers
21st-century American women writers
Novelists from Pennsylvania
Novelists from New York (state)